Jervois may refer to:
 Jervois Bridge, over the Port River in Port Adelaide, South Australia
 Jervois Basin Ships' Graveyard on the Port River, South Australia
 Jervois, South Australia, a town on the lower reaches of the Murray River
 Jervois Street in Sheung Wan, Hong Kong
 The Jervois, a 35-storey tower in Sheung Wan, Hong Kong
 Fort Jervois on Ripapa Island in New Zealand
 County of Jervois, a cadastral unit in South Australia

People with the surname Jervois
 General William Jervois (British Army officer) KH (1782 - 1862), Lieutenant Governor of Hong Kong
 Sir William Jervois, GCMG, CB (1821 – 1897), son of the above, British army officer, diplomat and Governor of Straits Settlements, South Australia and New Zealand

People with the first name Jervois
Jervois Newnham, Anglican bishop in Canada